Raspberry Cough is the debut studio album by Long Island Shoegaze band Petal Head. The album was recorded and produced by Latterman and Iron Chic guitarist Phil Douglas at his studio in Long Island called The Hobo House. The album was released on Dead Broke Rekerds on September 1, 2015.

Reception
The album received generally favorable reviews upon release. New Noise Magazine wrote “The band strips every dynamic and traditional sense out of conventional Alt Rock and build it up in their own loud and abrasive yet both parts dreamy and droning. Petal Head’s debut album Raspberry Cough takes you on a sonic journey through thick walls of sound into dreamscapes and then back into a dynamic onslaught of riffs without ever compromising the ride.“

Track listing
All music and lyrics written by Michael Guidice.

Personnel
Michael Guidice - Vocals, Guitars, Keyboards
Andy Laurino - Bass
Bradley Cordaro - Drums
Phil Douglas, Michael Guidice - Production
Carl Saff - Mastering
Bráulio Amado - Artwork

References

2013 debut albums
Petal Head albums